Statistics Canada conducts a country-wide census that collects demographic data every five years on the first and sixth year of each decade. The 2021 Canadian census enumerated a total population of 36,991,981, an increase of around 5.2 percent over the 2016 figure, Between 2011 and May 2016, Canada's population grew by 1.7 million people, with immigrants accounting for two-thirds of the increase. Between 1990 and 2008, the population increased by 5.6 million, equivalent to 20.4 percent overall growth. The main driver of population growth is immigration, not fertility, and, to a lesser extent, natural growth.

Canada has one of the highest per-capita immigration rates in the world, driven mainly by economic policy and, to a lesser extent, family reunification. In 2021, a total of 405,330 immigrants were admitted to Canada, mainly from Asia. New immigrants settle mostly in major urban areas such as Toronto, Montreal, and Vancouver. Canada also accepts large numbers of refugees, accounting for over 10 percent of annual global refugee resettlements.

Population 

The 2021 Canadian census had a total population count of 36,991,981 individuals, making up approximately 0.5% of the world's total population. A population estimate for 2022 put the total number of people in Canada at 38,232,593.

Demographic statistics according to the World Population Review in 2022.

One birth every 1 minutes
One death every 2 minutes
One net migrant every 2 minutes
Net gain of one person every 1 minute
Death rate
8.12 deaths/1,000 population (2022 est.) Country comparison to the world: 81
Net migration rate
5.46 migrant(s)/1,000 population (2022 est.) Country comparison to the world: 21st
Urbanization
urban population: 81.8% of total population (2022)
rate of urbanization: 0.95% annual rate of change (2020-25 est.)

Provinces and territories 

<onlyinclude>

Population distribution 
The vast majority of Canadians are positioned in a discontinuous band within approximately 300 km of the southern border with the United States; the most populated province is Ontario, followed by Quebec and British Columbia.

Sources: Statistics Canada

Cities

Census metropolitan areas

Fertility rate 

The total fertility rate is the number of children born in a specific year cohort to the total number of women who can give birth in the country. 

In 1971, the birth rate for the first time dipped below replacement and since then has not rebounded.

Canada’s fertility rate hit a record low of 1.4 children born per woman in 2020, below the population replacement level, which stands at 2.1 births per woman. In 2020, Canada also experienced the country’s lowest number of births in 15 years, also seeing the largest annual drop in childbirths (-3.6%) in a quarter of a century. The total birth rate is 10.17 births/1,000 population in 2022.

Mother's mean age at first birth 
Canada is among late-childbearing countries, with the average age of mothers at the first birth being 31.3 years in 2020.

Family size 
The average family size in Canada has shifted more towards either childless couples or couples who have either 1 to 2 children at a maximum.

Population projection 

According to Organisation for Economic Co-operation and Development (OECD)/World Bank, the population in Canada increased from 1990 to 2008 with 5.6 million and 20.4% growth in population, compared to 21.7% growth in the United States and 31.2% growth in Mexico. According to the OECD/World Bank population statistics, for the same period the world population growth was 27%, a total of 1,423 million people. However, over the same period, the population of France grew by 8.0%. And from 1991 to 2011, the population of the UK increased by 10.0%.

The current population growth rate for Canada in 2022 was 0.75%.

Life expectancy 
Life expectancy in Canada has consistently risen since the country's formation. 

School life expectancy (primary to tertiary education)
total: 16 years
male: 16 years
female: 17 years (2016)
Infant mortality rate
total: 4.5 deaths/1,000 live births. Country comparison to the world: 180th
male: 4.8 deaths/1,000 live births
female: 4.2 deaths/1,000 live births (2017 est.)

Age characteristics 

Age structure
0-14 years: 15.99% (male 3,094,008/female 2,931,953)
15-24 years: 11.14% (male 2,167,013/female 2,032,064)
25-54 years: 39.81% (male 7,527,554/female 7,478,737)
55-64 years: 14.08% (male 2,624,474/female 2,682,858)
65 years and over: 18.98% (male 3,274,298/female 3,881,126) (2020 est.)
Median age
total: 41.8 years. Country comparison to the world: 40th
male: 40.6 years
female: 42.9 years (2020 est.)

total: 40.6 years
male: 39.6 years
female: 41.5 years (2011)

Median age by province and territory in 2011
 Newfoundland and Labrador: 44.0
 Nova Scotia: 43.7
 New Brunswick:43.7
 Prince Edward Island: 42.8
 Quebec: 41.9
 British Columbia: 41.9
 Ontario: 40.4
 Yukon: 39.1
 Manitoba: 38.4
 Saskatchewan: 38.2
 Alberta: 36.5
 Northwest Territories: 32.3
 Nunavut: 24.1

Sex ratio 
at birth: 1.05 male(s)/female

0-14 years: 1.06 male(s)/female

15-24 years: 1.06 male(s)/female

25-54 years: 1.01 male(s)/female

55-64 years: 0.98 male(s)/female

65 years and over: 0.75 male(s)/female

total population: 0.98 male(s)/female (2022 est.

Dependency ratios
total dependency ratio: 47.3
youth dependency ratio: 23.5
elderly dependency ratio: 23.8
potential support ratio: 4.2 (2015 est.)

Vital statistics

Current vital statistics

Employment and income 
Unemployment, youth ages 15–24
total: 20.2%
male: 20.9%
female: 19.4% (2020 est.)

Ethnicity and visible minorities

Canadians as ethnic group by province 
All citizens of Canada are classified as "Canadians" as defined by Canada's nationality laws. "Canadian" as an ethnic group has since 1996 been added to census questionnaires for possible ancestral origin or descent. "Canadian" was included as an example on the English questionnaire and "Canadien" as an example on the French questionnaire. "The majority of respondents to this selection are from the eastern part of the country that was first settled. Respondents generally are visibly European (Anglophones and Francophones) and no longer self-identify with their ethnic ancestral origins. This response is attributed to a multitude or generational distance from ancestral lineage.

Ethnic origin

According to the 2021 Canadian census, over 450 "ethnic or cultural origins" were self-reported by Canadians. The major panethnic  groups chosen were; European, North American, Asian, North American Indigenous, African, Latin, Central and South American, Caribbean, Oceanian, and Other. Statistics Canada reports that 35.5% of the population reported multiple ethnic origins, thus the overall total is greater than 100%.

The country's ten largest self-reported specific ethnic or cultural origins in 2021 were Canadian (accounting for 15.6 percent of the population), followed by English (14.7 percent), Irish (12.1 percent), Scottish (12.1 percent), French (11.0 percent), German (8.1 percent), Chinese (4.7 percent), Italian (4.3 percent), Indian (3.7 percent), and Ukrainian (3.5 percent).

Of the 36.3 million people enumerated in 2021 approximately 25.4 million reported being "white", representing 69.8 percent of the population. The indigenous population representing 5 percent or 1.8 million individuals, grew by 9.4 percent compared to the non-Indigenous population, which grew by 5.3 percent from 2016 to 2021.  One out of every four Canadians or 26.5 percent of the population belonged to a non-White and non-Indigenous visible minority, the largest of which in 2021 were South Asian (2.6 million people; 7.1 percent), Chinese (1.7 million; 4.7 percent) and Black (1.5 million; 4.3 percent).

As data is completely self-reported, and reporting individuals may have varying definitions of "Ethnic origin" (or may not know their ethnic origin), these figures should not be considered an exact record of the relative prevalence of different ethno-cultural ancestries but rather how Canadians self-identify.

Data from this section from Statistics Canada, 2021.

The most common ethnic origins per province are as follows in 2006 (total responses; only percentages 10% or higher shown; ordered by percentage of "Canadian"):
 Quebec (7,723,525): Canadian (59.1%), French (29.1%)
 New Brunswick (735,835): Canadian (50.3%), French (27.2%), English (25.9%), Irish (21.6%), Scottish (19.9%)
 Newfoundland and Labrador (507,265): Canadian (49.0%), English (43.4%), Irish (21.8%)
 Nova Scotia (906,170): Canadian (39.1%), Scottish (31.2%), English (30.8%), Irish (22.3%), French (17.0%), German (10.8%)
 Prince Edward Island (137,375): Scottish (39.3%), Canadian (36.8%), English (31.1%), Irish (30.4%), French (21.1%)
 Ontario (12,651,795): Canadian (23.3%), English (23.1%), Scottish (16.4%), Irish (16.4%), French (10.8%)
 Alberta (3,567,980): English (24.9%), Canadian (21.8%), German (19.2%), Scottish (18.8%), Irish (15.8%), French (11.1%)
 Manitoba (1,174,345): English (21.8%), German (18.6%), Canadian (18.5%), Scottish (18.0%), Ukrainian (14.9%), Irish (13.2%), French (12.6%), North American Indian (10.6%)
 Saskatchewan (1,008,760): German (28.6%), English (24.9%), Scottish (18.9%), Canadian (18.8%), Irish (15.5%), Ukrainian (13.5%), French (12.2%), North American Indian (12.1%)
 British Columbia (4,324,455): English (27.7%), Scottish (19.3%), Canadian (19.1%), German (13.1%), Chinese (10.7%)
 Yukon (33,320): English (28.5%), Scottish (25.0%), Irish (22.0%), North American Indian (21.8%), Canadian (21.8%), German (15.6%), French (13.1%)
 Northwest Territories (40,800): North American Indian (37.0%), Scottish (13.9%), English (13.7%), Canadian (12.8%), Irish (11.9%), Inuit (11.7%)
 Nunavut (31,700): Inuit (85.4%)

Italics indicates either that this response is dominant within this province, or that this province has the highest ratio (percentage) of this response among provinces.

Visible minority population 

Note: Indigenous population decline between 1991 and 1996 censuses attributed to change in criteria in census count; "the 1996 Royal Commission on Aboriginal Peoples used a more restrictive definition of Aboriginal".

Indigenous population 

Note: Other Indigenous and mixed Indigenous groups are not listed as their own, but they are all accounted for in total Indigenous

Future projections

Statistics Canada projects that visible minorities will make up between 38.2% and 43.0% of the total Canadian population by 2041, compared with 26.5% in 2021. Among the working-age population (15 to 64 years), meanwhile, visible minorities are projected to represent between 42.1% and 47.3% of Canada's total population, compared to 28.5% in 2021.

Languages

Knowledge of language 

The question on knowledge of languages allows for multiple responses, and first appeared on the 1991 Canadian census. The following figures are from the 1991 Canadian census, 2001 Canadian census, 2011 Canadian census, and the 2021 Canadian census.

Mother tongue

Work

Home

Immigration 

According to the 2021 Canadian census, immigrants in Canada number 8.3 million persons and make up approximately 23 percent of Canada's total population. This represents the eighth-largest immigrant population in the world, while the proportion represents one of the highest ratios for industrialized Western countries.

Since confederation in 1867 through to the contemporary era, decadal and demi-decadal census reports have detailed immigration statistics. During this period, the highest annual immigration rate in Canada occurred in 1913, when 400,900 new immigrants accounted for 5.3 percent of the total population, while the greatest number of foreign-born individuals admitted to Canada in single year occurred in 2021, with 405,330 new immigrants accounting for 1.1 percent of the total population. 

Statistics Canada projects that immigrants will represent between 29.1% and 34.0% of Canada's population in 2041, compared with 23.0% in 2021, while the Canadian population with at least one foreign born parent (first and second generation persons) could rise to between 49.8% and 54.3%, up from 44.0% in 2021.

Religion

In 2021, 53.3% of Canadians were Christians, down from 67.3% in 2011. 29.9% were Catholic while 11.4% were Protestant (all other listed denominations excluding Christian Orthodox, Latter Day Saints and Jehovah's Witnesses). 7.6% were Christian not otherwise specified, 2.1% were "other Christian and Christian-related traditions", 1.7% were Christian Orthodox, 0.4% were Jehovah's Witnesses and 0.2% were Latter Day Saints adherents.

34.6% of Canadians were non-religious or secular, up from 23.9% in 2011. Of the non-Christian religions listed, 4.9% of Canadians were Muslim (3.2% in 2011), 2.3% were Hindu (1.5% in 2011), 2.1% were Sikh (1.4% in 2011), 1.0% were Buddhist (1.1% in 2011), 0.9% were Jewish (1.0% in 2011), 0.2% were believers of traditional (North American Indigenous) spirituality (same as 2011), and 0.6% were believers of other religions and spiritual traditions (0.4% in 2011).

See also

 Demographics of North America
 1666 census of New France
 Canada 2016 Census
 Canada 2021 Census
 List of Canadian census areas demographic extremes
 Interprovincial migration in Canada
 Canada immigration statistics
 Cahiers québécois de démographie academic journal
 Canadian Studies in Population academic journal

Notes

References

Further reading

 
 
 
 
 
 Roderic Beaujot and Don Kerr, (2007) The Changing Face of Canada: Essential Readings in Population, Canadian Scholars' Press, .

External links

 Canada Year Book (2010) – Statistics Canada
 Population estimates and projections, 2010 – 2036 – Statistics Canada
 Canada's population clock